Triptofordin C-2 is an antiviral chemical compound isolated from Tripterygium wilfordii.

References

Antiviral drugs
Sesquiterpenes
Benzoate esters
Acetate esters
Oxygen heterocycles
Heterocyclic compounds with 3 rings